The 1905 Philadelphia Phillies season was a season in Major League Baseball. The Phillies finished fourth in the National League with a record of 83 wins and 69 losses.

Preseason 
The Phillies conducted their spring training in 1905 for a week in Augusta, Georgia at Warren Park, and then in Savannah, Georgia where the team practiced and played exhibition games at Bolton Street Park. It was the second successive year the Phillies trained in Savannah.

1905 Philadelphia City Series

The Phillies played eight games against the Philadelphia Athletics for the local championship in the pre-season city series. The Athletics and Phillies tied in the series, 4 games to 4.

Two games scheduled for April 5, 1905 at the Phillies' Philadelphia Ball Park, and for April 6, 1905 at the Athletics' Columbia Park were called off on account of wet grounds.

The Phillies all time record against the A's was 14–14 through 1905.

Regular season

Season standings

Record vs. opponents

Roster

Player stats

Batting

Starters by position 
Note: Pos = Position; G = Games played; AB = At bats; H = Hits; Avg. = Batting average; HR = Home runs; RBI = Runs batted in

Other batters 
Note: G = Games played; AB = At bats; H = Hits; Avg. = Batting average; HR = Home runs; RBI = Runs batted in

Pitching

Starting pitchers 
Note: G = Games pitched; IP = Innings pitched; W = Wins; L = Losses; ERA = Earned run average; SO = Strikeouts

Other pitchers 
Note: G = Games pitched; IP = Innings pitched; W = Wins; L = Losses; ERA = Earned run average; SO = Strikeouts

Relief pitchers 
Note: G = Games pitched; W = Wins; L = Losses; SV = Saves; ERA = Earned run average; SO = Strikeouts

Notes

References 
1905 Philadelphia Phillies season at Baseball Reference

Philadelphia Phillies seasons
Philadelphia Phillies season
Philly